Saint-Simon is a commune in the Aisne department in Hauts-de-France in northern France.

History 
This place was the property of the House of Rouvroy, who became the Duke of Saint-Simon.

Population

See also
 Communes of the Aisne department

References

Communes of Aisne
Aisne communes articles needing translation from French Wikipedia